Walter Bortel (20 September 1926 – 19 February 2000) was an Austrian cyclist. He competed at the 1952 and 1956 Summer Olympics.

References

1926 births
2000 deaths
Austrian male cyclists
Olympic cyclists of Austria
Cyclists at the 1952 Summer Olympics
Cyclists at the 1956 Summer Olympics